Philippe Grenier (14 August 1865 – 25 March 1944) was a French politician who served as a member of the Chamber of Deputies for Doubs from 1896 to 1898. He became a convert to Islam during a trip to French Algeria in 1894 and later the first Muslim member of the French Parliament in history.

Career
Grenier studied in Besançon and Paris. A doctor by occupation in his home town of Pontarlier, he became a municipal councillor by campaigning on public health issues and public assistance.

He was later elected to the French Parliament with 51% of the vote in the second round in 1896; in the Chamber of Deputies he was registered as a member of the Radical Left. Mainly because of his support for regulatory laws on alcohol, he was not reelected in 1898. He ran for the seat again in 1902 but was beaten a second time.

References

1865 births
1944 deaths
People from Pontarlier
French Muslims
Converts to Islam
Politicians from Bourgogne-Franche-Comté
French republicans
Members of the 6th Chamber of Deputies of the French Third Republic